Faith47 / Faith XLVII (born Cape Town, 1979) is a South African interdisciplinary artist who has held solo exhibitions in Miami (2018), New York City (2015), London (2014) and Johannesburg (2012). As both a notable South African and woman artist, Faith speaks to issues of human rights, spiritual endurance and social issues.

Biography
As both a notable South African and woman artist, Faith speaks to issues of human rights, spiritual endurance and social issues. Faith XLVII began painting in 1997, three years after the end of apartheid. Using a wide range of media, her approach is explorative and substrate appropriate – from found and rescued objects, to time-layered and history-textured city walls, to studio-prepared canvas and wood. A self-taught artist, Faith is widely regarded as one of the most famous South African street artists, her art reaching international fame.

Common themes across Faith's work include sacred and mundane spaces as well as political problems, from environmental destruction, border abolition, and humanitarian issues. Her female figures speak to female empowerment. Her art and rich symbolism speaks to issues of injustice, poverty, and inequality. Her murals are often referred to as post-apartheid, as they confront the failure of neo-liberal politics of the South African Freedom Charter in violent and impoverished townships in South Africa. Her works are often associated with spirituality. In one of Faith's books she writes, "I am not religious but I pray through my work to unknown devils and gods. I look for my soul in colors and empty my being through parables of rusted, lost metal doors." She also has mentioned in an interview her process of urban exploration in which she feels spirits, "In empty buildings that felt like spiritual experiences, exploring holy chambers of neglected architecture... finding something so beautiful in what society disregards, and bringing to life that which usually people throw away or ignore."
One can see the influence on environment in her site specific works, exploring abandoned spaces in her work is a recurring basis.

Faith has a son, Keya Tama
Keya was born in 1997 and is an artist who has worked under the alias' Cashril Plusand Jack Fox  before finally settling on his given name, Keya Tama.

Faith has been extensively traveling and creating site-specific artwork globally since 2006. Her artwork can be found in over 50 cities worldwide.
Faith is a self-taught artist. Her schooling came through graffiti art of which she began in 1997.
Her move into contemporary gallery and studio environment, as well as her exploitive directions into multimedia projects can define Faith as a multidisciplinary artist  and in a league quite unique of her own.
Faith and Keya moved to Los Angeles in 2018.

Notable solo exhibitions

2012, Fragments of a Burnt History, David Krut Gallery, Johannesburg. Faith's first solo exhibition considered the transformation of Johannesburg into a more representative African city, exposing the harsh realities of day-to-day life and capturing the remnants of South Africa's complex history in a personal and symbolic manner. Through the creation of an immersive environment in the gallery space, this work challenged the viewer's detachment.

2014, Aqua Regalia – Chapter One, Moniker Projects, London. This exhibition further extended the possibilities of immersive spaces, enveloping the viewer into a sacred ‘room’ filled with collected objects and other intricacies from everyday life that – together with figurative paintings – explore the notion of the mundane as sacred, celebrating the discarded and unwanted as holy.

2015,Aqua Regalia – Chapter Two, Jonathan LeVine Gallery, New York. Was a continuation of this, again exploring the dichotomy between the sacred and the mundane by enveloping viewers in a space with figurative paintings, as well as intricacies from everyday life in shrine-like artworks. The two exhibitions were named after a highly corrosive mixture of nitric and hydrochloric acid that has the ability to dissolve gold.

2018, Elixir, Fabien Castanier Gallery, Miami. Elixir was a multi-disciplinary exhibition conceived by Faith XLVII that aimed to incite exploration in the viewer, both internally and externally. The project as a whole constructed a non-linear narrative, acting as a lens into an introspective view of the human condition. Amidst the chaos of today's economic, social and ecological upheavals, Elixir aimed to bring psychological questioning and healing to the viewer; a kind of elixir of life.

Street art

Following an active street art career spanning more than fifteen years, Faith's work can now be found in major cities around the world. Notable works include:

2010, The Freedom Charter, South Africa
Taking her inspiration from the old political slogans and stencils that were used during the struggle against apartheid, Faith brought to life sentences from the Freedom Charter document that she felt were still pressing in South Africa.

2012, The Taming of the Beasts, Shanghai
Faith painted ghostly rhinos on Shanghai walls at a time when the number of rhinos being poached for their horns was rising rapidly to meet demand from Asia.

2012, The Long Wait, Johannesburg
These murals, of groups of men in various postures of waiting, reference photographs from Alexia Webster's photographic series, Waiting for Work. The works imply different kinds of waiting particular to a contemporary South African context. As Faith47 told Wooster Collective, "Miners are waiting for justice. Workers are waiting for a living wage. People are waiting for service delivery. Refugees are waiting for assistance. Men are waiting for jobs. We are all waiting for an honest politician. So many people are waiting for others to do things first. To take the blame. To do things for them. To take the fall. To build the country. To admit defeat. There has been so much waiting in this country that much time has been lost."

2014, Harvest, Cape Town
A partnership between Faith47, Design Indaba and ThingKing, the multi-story artwork lit up at night each time enough money was raised for one new light to be installed on a pathway in the informal settlement of Monwabisi Park, Khayelitsha, through the organisation VPUU (Violence Prevention through Urban Upgrading). The intricate lighting pattern was an artistic endeavour that also served as a reminder that there were communities in the city that lack the luxury of light, which is a major public safety concern.

2015, The Psychic Power of Animals, New York
With this series, Faith47 reintroduced the energy of nature back into the urban metropolis, softening the harsh city architecture with the gracefulness and spirit-like presence of swans. "There's an inherent irony in recreating nature on cement, so the series is a nostalgic reminder of what we’ve lost but also an attempt to reintegrate that into the present," Faith47 said. "We have become so distanced from nature, so these murals are an attempt to reconnect us with the natural world."

2015, Estamos Todos Los Que Cabemos, Harlem
Painted as part of the Monument Art NYC project's focus on immigration, Estamos Todos Los Que Cabemos speaks of the migratory patterns of birds, observing that nature ignores human borders on a map.
“We forget that the dividing lines specifying countries were merely drawn by politically hungry men. In reality, the earth is open. There are no countries, no borders, it belongs to no one. We are transient visitors and should travel as we please," Faith47 told Arrested Motion.

2016, Landfill Meditation, South Africa 
Landfill Meditation reflects on the notion of progress and the waste that it leaves behind. This is about integrating the worst parts of ourselves and acknowledging the damage we do to the planet as a whole.

2017, 21.10.2015, Cape Town & Munich 
This collaboration between Faith XLVII and Imraan Christian, 21.10.2015 is a series of three works, first exhibited at Everard Read gallery  in Cape Town. The installation's starting point was a poignant image taken by Imraan during the 2015 #feesmustfall student protests in Cape Town. The photograph documents a pivotal turning point – the moment when peaceful protestors reacted violently as a response to sustained police brutality. The artwork intends to provoke and bring visibility to the need for transformation within the historical and institutional structures of South Africa.

2018, Salus Populi Suprema Lex Esto, Los Angeles
This project took the form of site-specific mural entitled “Salus Populi Suprema Lex Esto”, painted on Skid Row, Los Angeles. The large-scale public installation adorns the city wall, giving a monumental space to some of America's most marginalized people; the homeless. Skid Row is home to one of the largest populations of homeless people in the United States, with an estimated 2,500 people living on the streets within its .4 square mile radius.
The title of the work, which translates to “the welfare of the people shall be the supreme law,” is a critique on the capitalistic dream, which lacks institutional empathy for non-active participants.

2018, The Unbound, San Francisco 
Painted in San Francisco, The Unbound series covers the prominent UC Hastings University of Law Building in the Tenderloin.
‘The Unbound’ is an ode to the Peace Manifesto, an almost archetypal cry for ceasefire revisited throughout history by various groups and organizations.In this piece, Faith used the symbol of the White Flag in various stages of motion to give weight to these simple truths that are of great importance now more than ever.
“Watching the disharmony, the dismantling of human rights and the continuous struggle for equality is exhausting. The only way I can keep going is if I can transform some of this into my work.” Faith tells BOOOOOOOM

2019, Ad Pacem, Cincinnati 
Created in collaboration with artist, Inka Kendzia, Faith created a projection-mapped mural in Cincinnati during the Blink Light Festival. Faith's mural, thematically based on Eirene, the Greek goddess of peace, highlights the importance of actively working towards a society that functions on open communication and inclusion. The intricate projection was carefully constructed to interact within the artwork, layering a narrative alluding to borders, immigration, freedom of movement, peaceful protest, government oppression and the strength of the human spirit in overcoming these challenges.

2019, Mon Coeur, Lyon
In the weeks leading up to the sixth Global Fund Replenishment Conference, Faith completed a mural on the Maternity Ward of the Croix-Rousse hospital in Lyon. It was revealed along with 25 murals and installations, as part of a coordinated campaign across the globe (RED), aimed to drive heat and awareness around the AIDS fight.

2019, The Silent Watcher, Philadelphia
In Philadelphia, Faith completed her largest mural to date, as of 2019.
Standing 11.000 square feet tall, this piece pays tribute to Noam Chomsky, and calls out for brotherly love. The mural has become a visual landmark and gateway from University City to West Philadelphia.
In Faith's own words; ‘I come from a country that is seething with the frustration of uncontrollable violence and woman abuse, xenophobia , class and racial divide. And have moved to a country where there seems to be a fundamental crisis in the very soul of the nation. We know this ache of our lands.
And we all know personal ache. Everybody has their struggle to bear. And with the weight of the world on our shoulders, we must still be able to live with empathy, we must somehow keep our hearts open".

Immersive art
2017, 2018, 2019, Astronomia Nova"LA Summit : Astronomia Nova". Faith XLVII., Hologram - Sweden
2017, Mysterium Tremendum, Hologram - Miami
2017, 2018,Upper Atmospheric Lightning, Video Installation - Berlin, Cape Town
2017, 2019,Aurum"Aurum : Design Indaba 2019". Design Indaba., Performance - Berlin, Cape Town
2018, ЗОЛОТАЯ СЕРЕДИНА / The Golden Middle, Light Installation - Moscow
2018,The Disintegration of Self, Video Installation - London
2019, Ad Pacem, Projection Mapping Mural - Cincinnati

Reception
Faith's work has been featured in The Guardian, The New York Times, The Huffington Post, and The Independent.

"Faith47 celebrates the commonplace as holy in an attempt to disarm strategies of global realpolitik and advance the expression of personal truth. In this way her work is both an internal and spiritual release that speaks to the complexities of the human condition, its deviant histories and existential search." Juxtapoz

"Using different mediums, including graphite, spray paint, oil paint, ink, photography and collage, she usually paints on found objects or discarded documents, transferring the feel of her mural works. The transparency of her mark making and the texture of finished works give them a sense of age and spirituality. Often mixing religious iconography with ordinary, everyday elements and geometrical objects, her paintings, drawings and sketches seem to have an almost sacramental importance." Arrested Motion

“A South African artist whose textured imagery brings spirituality and nature to the foreground of urban environments." Huffington Post

"A rare incantation of both the earthly and the transcendent." Mass Appeal

"Transformative work... concerned with the valuation and transformation of things that have been lost or overlooked." Booooooom

"Deeply profound visions existing as physical aesthetic gifts for other viewers." Supersonic Art

"Equally at home in grimy alleys as she is in a studio, she creates murals that are both breathtaking and poignant. I challenge anyone to look at her work and not feel a little overawed by her talent." Carte Blanche

See also
 The Creators: South Africa Through the Eyes of Its Artists (2012)
 Capax Infiniti (2014)

References

External links
 Official Website

1979 births
Living people
Street artists
21st-century South African women artists
Pseudonymous artists
Women graffiti artists
Women muralists